An Inconvenient Penguin is a short film, released online in Amazon's UnBox store on August 11, 2008. The film is a spoof of An Inconvenient Truth and March of the Penguins.  It was produced by Precipice Productions and stars Lance Reifschneider, Rasika Mathur, Jenny Mollen, and Eric Matikosh.

Plot
Penguins are invading the shores of California causing overcrowding, excessive warmth and increasing crabbiness in general. Senator Al Gore warns us of the impending doom and what we can do to change the threat.

Cast
Lance Reifschneider as Senator Algore
Eric Matikosh as Burnell Wallerstadt
Jenny Mollen as Dr. Gootentag
Rasika Mathur as Dr. Sumi
Frank Walton as Eddie
Catherine Lamb as Penny the Penguin
Monica Thomas as Dawn
Andrea Zepeda as Angelica
Lisa Wardell as Cayenne
Brianna Haynes as Sage
Markiece Palmer as Elston
Minh Nguyen as Muriko
Eddie Walton as Atticus
Original Score by Austin Haynes
"Waddle We Do" performed by JAYLA

External links

Amazon Link
Official website
Precipice Productions Website

2008 films
American parody films
2000s parody films
2008 short films
American comedy short films
2008 comedy films
2000s English-language films
2000s American films